The 2021–22 Tennessee State Tigers basketball team represented Tennessee State University in the 2021–22 NCAA Division I men's basketball season. The Tigers, led by fourth-year head coach Brian Collins, played their home games at the Gentry Complex in Nashville, Tennessee as members of the Ohio Valley Conference.

Previous season
The Tigers finished the 2020–21 season 4–19, 3–17 in OVC play to finish in last place. Since only the top 8 teams qualify for the OVC tournament, they failed to qualify.

Roster

Schedule and results

|-
!colspan=12 style=| Exhibition

|-
!colspan=12 style=| Non-conference regular season

|-
!colspan=12 style=| OVC regular season

|-
!colspan=9 style=| Ohio Valley tournament

Sources

References

Tennessee State Tigers basketball seasons
Tennessee State Tigers
Tennessee State Tigers basketball
Tennessee State Tigers basketball